In Etruscan religion, the dii involuti ("veiled" or "hidden gods", also di involuti or dii superiores et involuti) were a group of gods, or possibly a principle, superior to the ordinary pantheon of gods. In contrast to the ordinary Etruscan gods, including the Dii Consentes, the dii involuti were not the object of direct worship and were never depicted. Their specific attributes and number are unknown;  suggests that they may represent either an archaic principle of divinity or "the very fate that dominates individualized gods".

The sky-god Tinia was believed to require their consent to cast the thunderbolt that announced disasters. According to Seneca in his Naturales quaestiones,

The dii involuti may be identical with the "Secret Gods of Favour" mentioned by Martianus Capella.

References

Etruscan religion
Etruscan deities
Time and fate deities
Aniconism